List of active landing craft of the French Navy is a list of landing craft currently in service with the French Navy. These craft operate from the Mistral-class amphibious assault ships in service with the Force d'action navale (Naval Action Force). As of July 2014, there are 16 in service.

Landing craft

See also
 French Navy
 List of active French Navy ships

References